Marcin Kobierski (born April 13, 1977) is a Polish sprint canoer who competed from the late 1990s to the early 2000s. He won two gold medals in the C-2 1000 m event at the ICF Canoe Sprint World Championships, earning them in 2001 and 2002.

Kobierski also competed in the C-2 500 m event at the 1996 Summer Olympics in Atlanta, but was eliminated in the semifinal round.

References

1977 births
Canoeists at the 1996 Summer Olympics
Doping cases in canoeing
Living people
Olympic canoeists of Poland
Polish male canoeists
Polish sportspeople in doping cases
People from Człuchów
ICF Canoe Sprint World Championships medalists in Canadian
Sportspeople from Pomeranian Voivodeship
20th-century Polish people